Brevis brevians, also known as iambic shortening or , is a metrical feature of early Latin verse, especially Plautus and Terence, in which a pair of syllables which are theoretically short + long (u –) can be scanned as a pair of short syllables (u u).

One common type is where a two-syllable word ends in a vowel which was originally long, for example  and so on. This type is also frequently found in classical Latin. For example:

"I want to know whether you will or won't allow us to cook dinner here?"

Another type, not found in classical Latin poetry, is where a closed syllable such as il- or ec- scans as a short syllable. This sometimes happens after a monosyllabic word, for example:

"What did they just say to each other? Tell me!"

It may also happen in the 2nd syllable of a 4-syllable word, for example:

"He's preparing a more bitter winter for his old age"

It is thought by many scholars that such shortenings reflect the actual pronunciation of colloquial Latin. Others, however, disagree and consider that the second type, where a closed syllable is shortened, is merely a metrical licence.

Main types

Shortening usually takes place in the context of a phrase.

The name brevis brevians

Shortening only takes place after a short syllable, hence the name , which is short for   "a short syllable which shortens the syllable which follows". The term  dates back to the 19th century, but it does not go back to antiquity, since no ancient grammarian or metrician discusses the phenomenon.

Where it is found
 is frequent in the comedies of Plautus and Terence, and in the fragments of other poets of the 2nd century BC, but, except in words of the first type above, it is generally not found in poets of the classical period such as Virgil and Ovid. Since the comedies were well known for imitating ordinary speech, it has been argued that it reflects the actual pronunciation of colloquial Latin. However, some scholars believe that only the first type is a genuine phenomenon of Latin speech, and that the other types are purely metrical.

Parallels to iambic shortening can be found in modern languages such as English: for example, the second syllable is shortened in monarch (where the first syllable is a single mora) but not in heptarch, Plutarch or oligarch. But there is some controversy about whether modern languages provide a genuine parallel to what some scholars see as a metrical phenomenon not caused by accent.

Characteristics

 In Plautus and Terence, the phenomenon is found in iambic, trochaic, and anapaestic verse, but not usually in bacchiac or cretic metres. It is more common in trochaic verse than in iambic, and it is also frequent in anapaestic verse (used by Plautus but not by Terence). In iambic and trochaic verses, instances are found at the beginning of a verse more than elsewhere.

 The syllable preceding the shortened syllable is always short. Thus  "I want" and  "I ask" can be shortened, but  "I believe" and  "I say" cannot be. Words such as  "I see" and  "I return", starting with a pair of short syllables, also cannot be shortened.

 It does not usually occur when a word like  or  ends a clause or sentence; in other words, there are usually words or syllables following the shortened syllable, e.g. , . However, there are some exceptions to this (see below).

 The shortened syllable is generally unaccented. Usually the word-accent comes either just before the shortened syllable or immediately after it. However, there are some apparent exceptions to this (see below).

  is optional. Sometimes there are long passages without , and other passages where it occurs frequently.

 A syllable shortened by  cannot shorten another syllable. However, this cannot be proved, as the metre will allow either scansion.

 A long vowel at the end of a two-syllable word is often shortened, e.g. .

 A word like  or  where the medial consonant is a mute + liquid, even though the first syllable is always short in Plautus, almost never undergoes iambic shortening.

The role of word-accent

Thus Wallace Lindsay writes: "The syllable that suffers shortening must be an unaccented syllable (i.e. according to sentence-accentuation). That is a necessary condition." He observes that the accented syllable can come either before or after the shortened syllable. A. M. Devine and Laurence Stephens suggest that both syllables of the iamb must be de-stressed for shortening to take place. In their view: "the shortening rule ... cannot operate if the heavy syllable bears the full word accent, nor if the light syllable retains its full stress".

However, not all scholars agree that iambic shortening is connected with word accent. In particular amongst Italian and French scholars it is a widely held belief that the Latin word accent in Plautus's day was a pitch accent, like that of Ancient Greek, which had no effect on the metre. Thus Cesare Questa, a specialist in the metres of Plautus, who in his earlier works accepted the role of the accent in causing iambic shortening, in his final work in 2007 rejected the idea, on the grounds that it was incompatible with his conviction that the Latin accent was a melodic or musical one.

Another Italian, Marco Fattori, pointing out that in quite a few cases the shortened syllable is apparently accented (for example ), takes the view that "the accent has no role in inducing IS [iambic shortening], regardless of its position." According to his statistics, cases such as  where a lexical word is accented on the shortened syllable are just as common as cases such as  where the accent follows the shortened syllable.

According to this view there is no reason to reject the idea that, as in many modern languages, word accent was the cause of the syllable shortenings observed in Latin. In those cases where the shortened syllable appears to be accented, therefore, scholars who believe word accent plays a role look for other explanations, such as positing that the accented syllable loses its stress when the main stress comes on another word in the sentence.

A metrical licence?
Another controversy which has been discussed for over a century is whether  was a real phenomenon of Latin speech, or simply a metrical licence heard in poetry. Lindsay expressed his view as follows: "Brevis Brevians is not a poetic licence, not a Procrustean plan of squeezing a round peg into a square hole, but echoes exactly the pronunciation of everyday (educated) talk".

The American scholar, Fortson, agreeing with Lindsay, writes: "The most likely theory in this writer’s view is that iambic shortening is linguistically real and affected iambic strings that were destressed or whose stress was subordinated to that of surrounding material, whence its most typical appearance in pronouns, particles, sentence adverbs, and strings of clitics."

Bettini gives as an example the word , which is shortened because it cannot fit otherwise into an iambic or trochaic verse, while  is not shortened.

Brevis brevians and metre

 is not particularly common in iambic metres, but more common in the more lively trochaic, and very common in anapaestic metres. However, it is almost never used in bacchiac and cretic metres.

In the iambic senarius,  is most commonly found at the beginning of the verse.

Iambo-trochaic metres
The two most common metres used in Roman comedy are the iambic senarius:
 | x – x – | x – x – | x – u – | ia6

and the trochaic septenarius:
 | – x – x | – x – x || – x – x | – u – | tr7

As can be seen, both metres consist of a succession of long elements (–) alternating with anceps elements (x), which can be long or short. Any long or anceps element, except at the line end or before the mid-point of a trochaic septenarius, can be resolved into two short syllables.

 is usually found where an element, either long or anceps, has been resolved. Thus a trochaic septenarius may begin in either of the following ways:
"so I want to know..." 
"but I want to know..."

Resolution, and hence also , is more common in some parts of the line than others. For example, in an iambic senarius, the first element (an anceps) is resolved in 27% of verses, but the 5th element in only 4%. Correspondingly  is also commonly found in the 1st element of a senarius, rarely in the 5th.

Very rarely  can also be found split between two elements where the sequence – x has been resolved into a tribrach (u u u), for example . However, this occurs mainly or exclusively with a small set of words of a kind labelled by Questa "quasi-pyrrhic" which are most frequently found in their shortened form.

In iambic and trochaic verse, anceps elements are usually unaccented.

Anapaestic metres
In anapaestic metre, which is only found in Plautus, not in Terence, the basic metron is u u – u u –. The  may occupy either the two short syllables of the pattern or a resolved long element. Anapaests were sung to music, and the characters often express strong emotion, as in this passage from Plautus's Cistellaria:

 

 
 

| uu –  uu –  | uu – uu – |
| uu –  uu –  | uu uu – |
| uu uu –  uu | –  uu uu – |
| uu –  uu –  | –  uu – |
| – uu  –  uu | –  –  uu – |
| uu uu –  uu | –  –  uu – |

"I am being carried, I am being taken apart, I am being pulled apart, I am being torn apart;
I have such a troubled mind!
Where I am, I'm not there, where I'm not, my mind is there;
I have so many moods!
What I want, I immediately don't want any more;
Love is playing so much with my mind!"

Reizianus and Wilamowitzianus

The Reizianus and Wilamowitzianus also have frequent . Examples in the versus Reizianus, for example, are: 
 (reiz)
"hold, hold!"
 (reiz)
"I would more willingly do it"
 (reiz)
"by God, even if you keep quiet"

While from the Wilamowitzianus come examples such as:
 (wil)
"won't you keep quiet, you fool?"
 (wil)
"angry with you"

Cretic and bacchiac metres
The cretic metre has a pattern – x – – u –, while the bacchiac has x – – x – –. In these metres there is usually no iambic shortening, and words like  and so on are used in their unshortened form.

Thus in the following cretic line  has its unshortened form, and  also is not shortened to :

| – u – | – u – || – u – | – u – |
"I want you to know this: I am ruined! wretched me!"

According to Lindsay, the bacchiac metre often has a tone of seriousness and he believed that it is for this reason  is avoided. An example of bacchiac metre is the speech of the old lady in Plautus's , who addresses her brother as follows, using the archaic -āī genitive:

. 
"I would like you to believe, brother, that I am speaking these words
because of my loyalty and of your interest,
as it befits your own sister to do."

Bettini has a different explanation. He argues that to introduce shortened syllables (e.g.  in the example above) would create ambiguity and obscure the basic u – – rhythm characteristic of the metre. This ambiguity never arises in the anapaestic metres, however, where  is common.

End of sentence

Usual rule
With a few exceptions,  does not end a clause or sentence. So in the phrase  "I want to know", which occurs several times in Plautus,  is always shortened, except once in cretic metre, but at the end of a sentence the long form is usually used, as in the following sentence:

. (tr7)
"Alcmene, there's one thing I want to ask you." – "Ask what you want."

Similarly, in the phrase  "go please" or   "go now",  is shortened, but at the end of a sentence,  takes on its unshortened form, e.g.

 (tr7)
"be quiet and go!" 

A parallel in English for  vs  might be follow  vs follow them, where the second syllable of follow is shortened when non-final.

Exceptions
 (ends ia7)
"do you get me?" – "I get you"
 (starts tr7)
"do you see? The crook is on the hunt"

The word  "I know" is also found with shortened final vowel when used as a sentence adverb:
 (starts ia6)
"I know, you're afraid of a trap"
 (tr7)
"I shall escape few things, I know; for many things will happen, and I deserve them"

There are other exceptions such as the following, where the verbs are possibly linked into a single accentual group:
 (starts tr7)
"when I asked, he said he hadn't seen you"
 (starts ia6)
"if he's in love, money will be given by me"

Sometimes other exceptions are found. In this example from Plautus, the word  is not shortened, but  is shortened even though it comes at the end of a sentence and before a change of speaker:

 (tr7)
"I want the soldier to be charmingly, wittily, and splendidly tricked." 
"By God, what you are ordering me to do will be a pleasure!"

Similarly  is shortened before a change of speaker in Terence's Adelphoe 261 and 281:
 (opens ia8)
"What's the matter?" – "What's the matter, do you ask?"

Examples of brevis brevians
Since in iambic and trochaic verse the word accent often tends to coincide with the long elements of the metres (the so-called "ictus"), in the list of examples below, the long elements have been marked in bold and the examples are grouped according as to whether they occur in a long element or in an anceps.

In an anceps
When an example of  occurs in an anceps element, it is usually followed by a word-accent, as in most of the examples below.

Dabit nēmō
A  is frequently found in the opening of an iambic line, as in most of the following examples. Usually the shortened syllable is a closed syllable containing a short vowel:

 (starts ia8)
"there's no one who will give"
 (starts ia6)
"Father has come"
 (starts ia6)
"you should know it's possible"
 (starts ia6)
"it is ordered by my brother?"
 (starts ia6)
"it can be done"
 (starts ia6)
"and he himself sees"
 (starts ia6)
"newly born"
 (starts ia6)
"I am indeed ordering it"

In other positions in iambic lines:
 (ends ia6)
"in front of a judge"
 (ends ia6)
"love whatever you like"
 (2nd anceps, ia7)
"don't say a word"

Quid hoc autem?
BB can also occur in a phrase starting with a monosyllable in the same positions:

 (starts ia7)
"but what's this?" ( was usually pronounced hocc)
 (starts ia6)
"what is that?" ( may have been pronounced /istúcc/)
 (starts ia6)
"and to take away"
 (starts ia6)
"so attentively"
 (starts ia6)
"in secret, poor things"
 (starts ia6)
"a good character"
 (starts ia6)
"at a time of high prices"
 (starts ia6)
"but here he is himself"
 (starts ia7)
"and between ourselves"
 (starts ia6)
"even this Pamphilus"
 (starts ia6)
"and he was saying his wife was in the farm"

In other positions of iambic lines:
 (in ia6)
"you should wait for me"
 (end of ia6)
"I always fled from this marriage"
 (in ia7)
"just now from Davus"
 (ends ia6)
"from the army"

Sed volo scīre

 (starts tr7)
"but I want to know"
 (starts tr7)
"what, your house?"
 (starts tr7)
"that we are going to be, against his will, ..."
 (starts tr7)
"but what's that?"
 (starts tr7)
"for from here for me"
 (ends tr7)
"but who (said) that to you?"

Voluptātem
Of similar accentuation are four-syllable words accented on the 3rd syllable. In these polysyllabic words, in most cases the shortened second syllable is also closed. These four-syllable words can start an iambic line:
 (starts ia6)
"I shall enjoy myself with pleasure, wine, and love"
 (starts ia6)
"that there is so much pleasure in it"
 (starts ia6)
"from young men"
 (starts ia6)
"did you pay the money?"

But words of this kind can also be placed immediately before the caesura of a senarius:
 (2nd anceps, ia6)
"if he doesn't want to do it voluntarily"
  (2nd anceps, ia6)
"of these pleasures"
 (2nd anceps, ia6)
"for his old age"
 (2nd anceps, ia6)
"who would administer here"
 (2nd anceps, ia6)
"where the magistrates are"

Sometimes words of this kind are also found without .
 (end of tr7)
"it's a pleasure for me" 

However, as Sturtevant showed, in words of shape u u – – it is more common for the long element to coincide with the penultimate syllable than with the first.

Amicitiam
Occasionally a long vowel in a four-syllable word is shortened. However, this is very rare compared with cases like  where the shortened syllable is closed. Usually, in a word like  the long vowel is retained, while the shortened form occurs only once: 

 (1st anceps, tr7)
"friendship"
 (starts ia6)
"modesty"
 (2nd anceps, ia6)
"Syracuse"
 (ends ia6)
"were you afraid?" (but some manuscripts have )

 (in ia8)
"it completely melted"
 (ends tr7)
"I gave an order for them to be heated up"

Dedi mercātōrī
However, it is thought that in a word like  the first syllable had a secondary accent:

 (starts ia6)
"I gave it to a merchant"
 (3rd anceps, ia6) 
"you entrusted a sheep to a wolf"
 (starts tr7) 
"but our doors have made a noise"

And in a fragment of one of Ennius's tragedies:
 (2nd anceps, tr7)
"I am surrounded in many ways"

Per oppressiōnem
The shortened syllable is a closed one:
 (starts ia6)
"through force"
 (starts ia6)
"and in deterring"
 (starts ia6)
"but carelessly"
 (starts ia6)
"jokes"

Sed uxōr scelesta
This type presents potential difficulties for those who believe that the shortened syllable must be unstressed, since  and so on are usually stressed on their first syllable. The usual explanation for instances of this type is to assume that these words are subordinated accentually to a word later in the sentence, and are thus deaccented.

This concept is familiar from English; for example, the word already is accented in he's done it alreády but loses its accent before dóne in he's already dóne it.

Fattori, however, disagrees, and argues that the shortened syllable is actually accented. He cites examples where the shortened syllable appears to be focussed and therefore emphatic (see further below).

 (starts ia6)
"but my wretched wife watches me in every way"
 (starts ia7)
"what's going to happen to those others?"
 (starts ia6)
"and that is a very great vice of mine"
 (starts ia6)
"by Pollux, I'm glad that thing turned out well for you"
 (starts ia6)
"which they believe is a strong criticism"
 (starts ia6)
"so much did it knock down all the tiles from the roof"

The following are found in trochaic metre:
 (starts tr7)
"I did not buy her officially"
 (starts tr7)
"and for a message to be sent to him"
 (ends tr7)
"because on that day I hadn't had breakfast"
 (tr7)
"more charming in every way and who isn't... "

And in a long element:
 (starts tr7)
"I'll wait for him in front of the house"

Nēmini plūra
It is rare in Plautus and Terence's iambo-trochaic lines, but common in anapaests. However, in the first foot of a verse this rule was applied less strictly:
 (starts tr7)
"to no one more things"
 (starts tr7)
"whom is it fairer for us..."
 (starts tr7)
"(has made) me devoid and empty of all..."

Words with cretic shortening could freely be used in anapaestic verse, as in the following:
 (an)
"I am being pulled apart, I am being torn apart"
 (an)
"a cloudy mind"

An exception to the rule that cretic shortening does not usually occur in iambic or trochaic metre is the word , which is regularly shortened in expressions such as :
 (starts tr7)
"some imposter or other"

 is also found with a short -o even in Virgil, so the pronunciation with a short -o seems to have been regular in Latin.

Mātris imperium
In another group the  begins from the last syllable of a two-syllable word. However, this is very rare in iambic and trochaic verse. The first four are found in the 2nd element of the line, where metrical license is more common. Some of these examples are dubious and have been questioned by editors.
 (starts tr7)
"he has gone"
 (starts tr7)
"he's walking sadly"
 (starts tr7)
"take away those things"
 (starts tr7)
"from this same place from where it arises"
 (starts 2nd half tr7)
"a mother's rule"
 (starts 2nd half of tr7)
"say, show me"
 (end of ia8)
"to mix with girls of that sort"
 (but Questa prefers ) (ends ia6/tr7)
"is anyone opening this door?"

Such scansions are also found in anapaests:
 (an)
"he will receive from nobody"

 (starts ia7)
"in the midst of that business, however"

Quis ego sim
Similar in rhythm to the above group are the following, in which a long + anceps (– x) is replaced by a tribrach split after the first syllable (u, u u). This is evidently allowable when iambic shortening is not involved (e.g. ); but can  also occur in this situation (e.g. ), or is the scansion u, u – preferable?

According to Questa, in such situations if a shortened word is used it is always one of the very common "quasi-pyrrhic" words such as  etc. of which the shortened form was already well-established in Plautus's day and continued to be used in classical times. He reports that other words such as  cannot be used in this way.

In the first six examples below except the shortening occurs in a position in the verse where a short syllable is usually required:
 (4th anceps, ia7)
"who I am"
 (4th anceps, ia7)
"what was with you"
 (4th anceps, ia7)
"but where on earth" 
 (ends tr7)
"and I you"
 (ends ia6)
"as if for me..."
 (starts cr2)
"but you"

In other places in the line, the scansion is ambiguous, and it is not clear if the shortened form is intended or not:
 (starts tr7)
"he died there"
 (starts tr7)
"for I will tell you"

Aliqua tibi spēs
The following are very similar to the above, but are not preceded by a monosyllable. Again, the metre is ambiguous as to whether the shortened form is intended; however, Lindsay argues that the first at least has , since  is always shortened before a noun.

Long elements split in this way starting from the end of a non-monosyllabic word are not uncommon. Except in the first foot they are always preceded by a short syllable. (This does not apply when the sequence starts with a monosyllabic word: .) In most cases where there is no iambic shortening a sequence – x with split long is realised as a tribrach (u, u u) not an anapaest (u, u –).

From Plautus:
 (4th anceps, ia7)
"some hope for you"
 (5th anceps, ia6)
"how the matter ... for you"
 (in tr7)
"here in the house where you live"
 (ends tr7)
"say 'my darling' to me"

From Terence:
, (starts ia7)
"for me nothing"
 (ends ia6)
"I will more easily (achieve) what I want"
 (in ia8)
"he considered nothing was more important"
 (in ia8)
"I am conscious that I..."

The above examples use quasi-pyrrhic words (words whose double-short pronunciation was the usual one and which continued to be short in classical Latin). Examples like the following are more controversial, since according to Questa and others, only pyrrhic words and quasi-pyrrhics can be split between elements in this way:

From Plautus:
 (ends tr7)
"a case is being heard in front of a judge"
 (2nd anceps, tr7)
"say, therefore, where is she?"

From Terence:
 (2nd anceps, tr7)
"no man entertains better" (scansion uncertain)
. (ia8)
"if ever I have a son, he will certainly find me to be an indulgent father"

Raffaelli (1978), examining all the cases of the kind  in Terence's iambic octonarii, tentatively suggested that  might be found here even though the word  is not quasi-pyrrhic. It seems that when a long element is split in this way, which is more frequent in Terence than in Plautus, the succeeding anceps is always either a short syllable, or potentially short by iambic shortening, never a double short.

Other possibilities have been suggested. One is that simply there is no shortening here.

The French scholar Louis Havet believed that in all these cases where a final short syllable coincides with a long element, the final syllable functioned as long; in other words the sequence u, uu is equivalent to – uu.

Molestae sunt
The following are surprising since they seem to be accented on the shortened syllable:
 (starts ia6) 
"they are a nuisance"
 (Lindsay reads ) (starts ia6)
"this house is sinful"

In the same way the phrase  "I am wretched" (never ) seems to have been accented (according to Lindsay) in all six occurrences in Plautus on the second syllable with  enclitic.

The phrase  occurs ten times in Plautus, always at the end of a trochaic or iambic line, for example:
 (ends tr7)
"but, my darling"

One explanation is that the phrase was accented as a single word, with the accent on -tās. However, this is not certain.

In a long element

Modo mē pugnīs
When a  occupies a long element in the metre, a common pattern is a kind where the accent falls on the 1st and 4th syllables of the sequence u u x – x. This kind of  always occurs in a long element, conforming to the metrical ictus. The syllable immediately following the shortened syllable is accentless. This type is typically found in trochaic metre, as in the following line, in which it occurs twice:

 (tr7)
"What's this business that all the people are gossiping about in the streets?"

In the great majority of cases, the shortened syllable is a closed syllable containing a short vowel.

 (2nd long, tr7)
"along with the messenger"
 (tr7)
"there will be a protection"
 (ends tr7)
"I know what you did"
 (starts tr7)
"the birds grow accustomed to it"
 (starts tr7)
"cheer up"
 (starts tr7)
"do you see the entrance-hall?"
 (tr7)
"me, just now with his fists"
 (starts tr7)
"indeed, that more than other things"
 (2nd half, tr7)
"there is need for firewood and charcoal"

The phrase  can also occur in an anceps (see above).

In iambic lines the pattern is less common:
 (ia6) 
"I will say it in front of the praetor"
 (ends ia8)
"of every pleasure"

Quid est quod metuās
Other examples with similar rhythm start from a monosyllable.
 (starts tr7)
"what are you afraid of?"
 (tr7)
"what is that ...to you"
 (tr7)
"why are you asking that?"
 (starts tr7)
"what sort of man would this be?"
 (starts tr7)
"he's exempt"
 (tr7)
"what was promised"
 (5th long, tr7)
"that it was used up"
 (tr7)
"which you received"
 (in tr7)
"which all the people"
 (starts tr7)
"I'll go and buy some food"
 (tr7)
"nor did I even see her" (emphasis on )
 (starts tr7)
"and that she, along with the messenger..."
 (starts tr7)
"I'll find her"
 (in tr7)
"to you, that deed"
 (in tr7)
"what he is saying"

In iambics:
 (in ia6)
"I'm glad it turned out well"
 (1st long, ia6)
"it's in that port"
 (1st long, ia6)
"for what those malevolent people are saying"
 (1st long, ia6)
"but what's this shouting...?"
 (3rd long, ia6)
"who is this girl who..."

Lindsay reads the following as two short syllables rather than one long syllable by synizesis:
 (2nd long, ia6)
"about that battle"
 (2nd long, ia6)
"I will chat with her"

Mane man(e) audī
The examples below are similar, but the pattern u u u – starts with a two-syllable word: 
 (starts tr7) 
"I know why you are making a mistake"
 (starts tr7) 
"a good friend"
 (3rd long, tr7)
"I want you to tell the truth"
 (starts tr7) 
"wait, wait, listen!" 
 (tr7) 
"wait, wait, I beg you"

This pattern is less common in iambic lines:
 (ends ia6)  
"there is good will"

Quid abstulistī
The examples below also have a pattern u u u – but starting from a monosyllable. Devine and Stephens note that even though  probably had a secondary stress on the first syllable, this did not prevent . They conclude that in such cases both the first and the second syllable of the  group were de-stressed:

 (starts tr7)
"what did you take away from here?"
 (starts tr7)
"that this deed..."
 (5th long, tr7)
"what do you say is..."
 (2nd long, tr7)
"what he says"
 (2nd long, tr7)
"I that experienced panderer"
 (starts tr7)
"but is my brother inside?"
 (starts tr7)
"but who is this old man?"

In the following it is possible that the accent moved to -crās; otherwise the shortening is puzzling:
 (in tr7)
"why are you begging me?"

Similar is the following (which is thought to be an interpolation by some editors), in which op- similarly appears to be accented:
 (ia6)
"for to any man, whether the best or worst"

Nēminem venīre
In the following the shortened syllable comes at the end of a cretic word (– u –) and is followed by an unaccented syllable. They come in the first foot of an iambic line, where metrical licence is sometimes found:
 (starts ia6)
"that no one was coming"
 (starts ia6) (or ?)
"the other a boy of four"
 (starts ia4)
"I fall off the couch"

But  "something" and similar expressions can occur in other places in the line:
 (2nd foot, ia8)
"he's bringing bad news"

Again the examples begin an iambic line:
 (starts ia6)
"as indeed he said"
 (starts ia6)
"provided by Hercules that she is married to you"

The rhythm of these is similar to iambic lines beginning ,  and so on which have no .

Dedisse dono
There are a number of instances of individual words in which the shortened syllable appears to be accented. The following occur in a long element:
 (in tr7)
"they are very similar"
 (starts tr7)
"to have given as a gift"
 (in tr7)
"it is necessary to do"
  (starts tr7)
"certainly I saw"
 (ia6)
"pierce with arrows the thieves of treasuries"

"he finds his friends (behaving) accordingly"

If shortening only occurs when the syllable is unaccented, this presents a difficulty. One possibility is that the accentuation of these words was different from the usual rule. Certainly it is known that the accentuation of some words was irregular. Lindsay suggests that classical  "window" is derived from an earlier , which may have been Plautus's pronunciation. The word  "in the same manner" is attested by Priscian as being accented on the first syllable. However, Lindsay calls the apparent accentuation of  "a puzzle". It appears here and two other places at the beginning of a trochaic line, but at least 64 times with the normal accentuation .

However, agreement has not been reached on all of them.

Sed uxōrem suam
Most of the examples above, both in anceps and in long elements, are accented in a way which conform with the verse ictus. However, there are a few examples where following the  there is a clash between accent and ictus. This is often found near the verse end, where a clash of ictus and accent are normal:

 (ends ia6)
"but his wife"
 (ends ia6)
"at the table it is fitting..."
 (ends tr7)
"I opened the doors"
 (ends tr7)
"it's a pleasure for me"
 (ends tr7)
"I walked away deliberately"
 (ends tr7)
"what kind of evil is this?"

A little further from the verse end are the following:
 (ends ia6)
"which all mortals know"
 (ends ia6)
"she is under the control of a man"
 (end of ia6)
"whatever is in that box"

But this type also sometimes comes at the beginning of a trochaic septenarius or at the beginning of the second hemistich, where a strong stress on the second syllable of the metron (e.g. ) would violate Meyer's law (see Metres of Roman comedy).

 (starts tr7)
"what money? what nonsense are you telling me?"
 (starts tr7)
"I know what you're going to say"
 (starts 2nd half, tr7)
"I (will seek) compensation from you"
 (starts tr7)
"you will hide in secret"
 (starts tr7)
"I'm shaking him gradually" (i.e. persuading him)
 (starts 2nd half, tr7)
"but he will buy her"

Fattori points out that in this last example, the word  appears to be emphasised, despite being shortened. The whole line is as follows:
 (tr7)
"I haven’t bought her formally." – "But he will buy her formally. Let it be.” (trans. De Melo)

However, the intonation of an ancient language cannot always be known exactly, so this example does not necessarily rule out the view that the shortened syllable must be unaccented.

There are also some trochaic lines beginning with :
 (starts tr7)
"but meanwhile the doors have made a noise: I must watch my tongue"
 (starts tr7)
"but meanwhile what is my son doing there all this time with Syrus?"

Ubi volēs
 (starts tr7; also in ia6)
"when you want"
 (ends tr7)
"there for you"
 (ends tr7)
"just be quiet"
 (ends ia6)
"to give to you"
 (5th long, tr7)
"in the market-place"

Abi iam

 (tr7)
"go now"
 (starts tr7)
"see, please"
 (in tr7)
"go away from here please"
 (starts tr7)
"keep quiet, you!" 
 (tr7)
"that's right, I'm not"
 (tr7)
"that's right, I am"
 (ia6)
"are you sure of that?"

(tr7),  (tr7).

Type of words shortened

Ending in a long vowel

In 1890, Leppermann listed all the iambic two-syllable words with a long vowel in the second syllable that occur in Plautus's iambic and trochaic lines, omitting those at the end of a verse. The results of his survey are summarised by Mańczak (1968). From this it would appear that some words were more often shortened than others.

 The most common words are the ones most often shortened. In all of these the shortened version is much commoner than the unshortened. Leppermann does not include the words , perhaps because the second vowel was nearly always short. All of these words, which Questa calls "quasi-pyrrhics", are also frequently found with a shortened vowel in later Latin. The word , when it is an adverb meaning "just now" or "only", was usually shortened, and is counted as a quasi-pyrrhic, but  (ablative of  "way") had a long second vowel. This rule also applies in Virgil.

 Common imperatives with a short first vowel are also frequently shortened, for example .

They are not included among the quasi-pyrrhics by Questa, since they are not used in split-resolution shortening of the type .

 The noun  is usually not shortened, despite being very common:
. (ia6)
"I'm a man; I consider nothing human alien from me"

(Possibly here  is accented on the second syllable, with  enclitic; in the same way according to Lindsay  appears to have been accented on the second syllable.)

 Nouns with long-vowel case-endings, such as genitive, dative, ablative singular or nominative plural, are very rarely shortened, for example .

Ending in a consonant

 Two-syllable words ending in a short vowel and one or more consonants can also undergo shortening, for example:
 (both very frequent), .

 Words ending in -is or -us in Plautus's day usually had a weak or silent -s, which did not count in the scansion except by preventing elision before a vowel. This dropping of -s before a consonant appears to have been the rule rather than the exception in Plautus's Latin.

 Iambic nouns and verbs ending in -r and -t such as  had a long vowel in Plautus's time. There is a difference, however, between Plautus and Terence.

Nouns ending in -s such as  also usually remain unshortened in both authors.

Words with synizesis

But Lindsay believes that the 1st person  "I am going" was a dissyllable. It seems that the single-syllable form of such words was used when they were unemphatic. 

Synizesis is also thought to have occurred between words. For example, in the following line, where suō hos- makes up a single element in the metre, Questa suggests that rather than  the syllables merged into something like /swos-/:

 (ia6)
"and so he is humouring that lover, his guest"

It is unclear whether the following is also an instance of synizesis or whether, as Questa scans it, it has :
 (starts ia8)
 
"when they all find out everything"

Authors who used brevis brevians
 was associated particularly with conversational styles, especially the more lively speech of the trochaic verses of Roman comedy. It is thus often found in Plautus, Terence, and in the fragments of Caecilius (early 2nd century BC), Afranius, a comic dramatist of about 100 BC, and in the farces of Lucius Pomponius of about 90 BC. However, it is generally not used in cretic and bacchiac metres even in Plautus.

However, there are two examples in the 11-line fragment of Ennius's hexameter work on gourmet eating, Hedyphagetica:  "at Cumae" and  "why have I omitted the parrot-wrasse?" (a kind of fish). There are also five or six examples in the fragments of Ennius's tragedies, such as in this trochaic septenarius from his Alexander:
.
"It is here, it is here, the torch wrapped in blood and fire!"

A few other examples are found in fragments of tragedies of Pacuvius and Lucius Accius, and one or two also (such as ) in the satires of Lucilius, both trochaic and dactylic.

In classical Latin poetry, apart from  "do you see?", mentioned above, iambic shortening is only found in words ending in a vowel. The word  "do not" is shortened in both Catullus and Ovid and  'hail, hello' in Ovid. (According to Quintilian,  with short -e was the usual pronunciation in his day, the long form being used only by pedantic people.) 

Apart from these, the final vowel -ō is most subject to shortening, especially in 1st person verbs. In Ovid it seems that such shortened words are often found after a (non-lexical) monosyllabic word, e.g. . The word  "quickly" is also sometimes shortened in Ovid (e.g. ).

Expressions of the type  "someone" with short -o are found in Catullus and Virgil and are very frequent in Ovid.

Parallels in English
This is sometimes seen in English too. For example, the vowel of -arch is shortened in monarch, but not in Plutārch, heptārch or oligārch. To test this idea a study was made of two-syllable words contained in J. C. Wells's Longman Pronunciation Dictionary. When words such as haddock, hassock, bishop with a short first syllable were compared with others with a long first syllable, such as epoch, kapok, Aesop, the reduced vowel /ə/ was much more commonly found in the first group. In modern linguistics this effect is sometimes known as "Fidelholtz's Law" or the "Arab rule", from the two US pronunciations of the word "Arab" ( and ). Another finding of the study was that "more frequent words are more likely to have a reduced second vowel than less frequent words".

W. S. Allen observed that in two-syllable words ending in -ō such as ĕcho and vēto, the final vowel is more often reduced when the first syllable is short.

In Latin, according to Lindsay, the word accent usually comes either on the syllable before, or on the syllable after the shortened syllable, but not on the shortened syllable itself. This is also true of English. Thus the second vowel is long in allērgic, but shortened in állĕrgy or allĕrgénic. As Devine and Stephens note, in English and other languages words vowels are reduced or deleted both before and after a stress, e.g. d(e)vélopment, féd(e)ral. They also observe that in a sentence such as it would have been fúnny if she'd cóme in rapid speech all the words are reduced except the two stressed ones.

In English, auxiliary verbs such as is, are, will, have, etc. are often shortened (I'll go, it's raining, etc.) Pronouns such as he, we, you can also be shortened when unaccented (is he here?, what are you doing?); and function words, conjunctions and prepositions such as not, because, if, of, for, to are also frequently shortened when unstressed. In the sentence What ăre you afraid of?, where afraid is focussed, the word are is shortened.
 
In Latin, shortening is more likely to occur within a phrase rather than at the end of a sentence, for example,  vs . Similarly the word follōw, which usually has a long vowel at the end of a sentence, is shortened in a phrase such as follŏw them.

In words such as volunteer, adaptation, anecdotal, ministerial, where the first syllable is short and the third is accented, the second syllable tends to be short also.

In modern linguistic studies of syllable rhythm there is ambiguity in terminology, since words like Latin  and English follow are metrically iambs, but (since they are accented on the first syllable) accentually trochees. Some works therefore refer to the shortening observed in  >  as "trochaic shortening".

Bibliography

Allen, W. S. (1978). Vox Latina: A Guide to the Pronunciation of Classical Latin, 2nd ed. CUP.
Beare, W. (1953). "The Meaning of Ictus as applied to Latin Verse".  Hermathena, No. 81 (May 1953), pp. 29–40.
Bettini, M. (1991). "La correptio iambica". In Metrica classica e linguistica: atti del colloquio, Urbino 3-6 ottobre 1988 (pp. 89–205). QuattroVenti.
Dabouis, Quentin; Enguehard, G., Fournier, J-M, Lampitelli, N. (2020). "The English "Arab Rule" without feet". Acta Linguistica Academica, March 2020, 67(1):121–134.
Devine, A. M.; Stephens, L. D. (1980). "Review Article: Latin Prosody and Meter: Brevis Brevians". Review of Latin-Romance Phonology: Prosodics and Metrics by Ernst Pulgram. Classical Philology Vol. 75, No. 2 (Apr., 1980), pp. 142–157.
Exon, Charles (1906). "The Relation of the Resolved Arsis and Resolved Thesis in Plautus to the Prose Accent". The Classical Review Vol. 20, No. 1, pp. 31–36.
Fattori, Marco (2021). "What are we talking about when we talk about ‘iambic shortening’?". Linguistic Studies and Essays 59(2) 2021: 97–132.
Fortson, Benjamin W. (2008). Language and Rhythm in Plautus: Synchronic and Diachronic Studies.
Fortson, Benjamin W. (2011). "Latin Prosody and Metrics". In J. Clackson (ed.), A companion to the Latin language, 92–104. Malden, MA–Oxford: Wiley-Blackwell. 
Hyde, Brett (2011) "The Iambic-Trochaic Law". In Harry van der Hulst, Colin Ewen, Elizabeth Hume & Keren Rice (eds.), The Blackwell Companion to Phonology, 1052–1077. Oxford University Press.
Leppermann, H. (1890). De correptione vocabulorum iambicorum, quae apud Plautum in senariis atque septenariis iambicis et trochaicis invenitur. Commentatio philologica. Monasterii Guestf. (Münster)
Lindsay, W.M. (1893). "The Shortening of Long Syllables in Plautus". The Journal of Philology, Vol. 22, Iss. 44,  (Jan 1, 1893): 1.
Lindsay, W.M. (1922). Early Latin Verse. Oxford.
Mańczak, W. (1968). "Iambenkürzung im Lateinischen". Glotta 46. Bd., 1./2., pp. 137–143.
Mester, R.A. (1994). "The Quantitative Trochee in Latin". Natural Language and Linguistic Theory 12. 1–61.
Meunier, Christine; Espesser, Robert (2011). "Vowel reduction in conversational speech in French: the role of lexical factors." Journal of Phonetics, Elsevier, 2011, 39 (3), pp.271–278.
Prince, Alan (1991). "Quantitative Consequences of Rhythmic Organization" (lecture).
Questa, Cesare (2007). La Metrica di Plauto e Terenzio (2007). Urbino: Quattro Venti.
Raffaelli, Renato (1978). "I longa strappati negli ottonari giambici di Plauto e di Terenzio". In: Problemi di metrica classica. Miscellanea filologica, Genova 1978
Schlicher, J. J. (1902). "Word-Accent in Early Latin Verse." The American Journal of Philology, Vol. 23, No. 1 (1902), pp. 46–67.
Sonnenschein, E.A. (1929). "Ictus and Accent in Early Latin Dramatic Verse". The Classical Quarterly, Vol. 23, No. 2 (Apr., 1929), pp. 80–86.
Stephens, Laurence (1985). "New Evidence concerning Iambic and Cretic Shortening in Classical Latin". Classical Philology Vol. 80, No. 3 (Jul., 1985), pp. 239–244
Stephens, Laurence (1986). "The Shortening of Final -o in Classical Latin: A Study in Multiple Conditioning and Lexical Diffusion of Sound Change". Indogermanische Forschungen (1986).
Sturtevant, E.H. (1919). "The Coincidence of Accent and Ictus in Plautus and Terence". Classical Philology, Vol. 14, No. 3 (Jul., 1919), pp. 234–244.

References

 
Prosodies by language